Renewable energy in Luxembourg comes from hydro power, wind, biomass and solar power.

Policy
Policy that supports renewable energy development in Luxembourg is the 1993 Framework Law (amended in 2005), in which there are special tariffs given to different type of renewable energy used and subsidies available for private companies that invest in renewable energy technology.

Generation
In 2005, renewable energy contributed to the 24.8% electricity generation in the country, which comprises pump storage (19.0%), hydro (2.3%), biomass (1.8%), wind (1.3%) and solar (0.4%).

See also

 Energy in Luxembourg

References

External links